The London Informer was a free newspaper  published every Friday in west London.

External links
London Informer
London Informer

London newspapers
Free newspapers